6P or 6-P may refer to:

6P, IATA code for Club Air
6P/d'Arrest, a periodic comet
6-P, abbreviation for 6-phosphate
Mannose 6-phosphate
Mannose 6-phosphate receptor 
Glucose 6-phosphate
Glucose-6-phosphate dehydrogenase
F9F-6P, a model of Grumman F-9 Cougar
6P, former abbreviation for  LMS Patriot Class, and a Classification of steam locomotives by British Railways, denoting a locomotive rated for Passenger trains
6P, NASA code for Progress M1-7
6p, an arm of Chromosome 6 (human)
Nexus 6P, a smartphone manufactured by Huawei
Renault 6P, an aircraft engine designed by Renault in the 1920s
6P, the production code for the 1984 Doctor Who serial Resurrection of the Daleks
6, P, the citation form of Perri 6

See also
P6 (disambiguation)
PPPPPP (disambiguation)